Ania Spiering is a Russian born American actress and fashion model known for films Argo, Land of the Lost and The Hungover Games. She was also a face of the fourth season of American Horror Story: Freak Show.

References

External links

Ania Spiering on Instagram 
Ania Spiering
BIANCA STARR : ONE LIFE : BIANCA@BIANCASTARR.COM
Interview with Ania Gerasimova-Spiering

Living people
American film actresses
American female models
Year of birth missing (living people)
21st-century American women